The 2015 WNBA season was the 16th season for the Indiana Fever of the Women's National Basketball Association.

Transactions

WNBA Draft
Chelsea Gardner Round 2 pick 21 (Kansas)

Roster
 Briann January (PG)
 Shavonte Zellous (SG)
 Marissa Coleman (SF)
 Tamika Catchings (PF)
 Natalie Achonwa (C)
 Maggie Lucas(PG)
 Jeanette Pohlen (SG)
 Natasha Howard (SF)
 Lynetta Kizer (PF)
 Erlana Larkins (PF)
 Layshia Clarendon (PG)
 Shenise Johnson (SF)

Schedule

Playoffs
Round 1 (conference semifinals) vs Chicago Sky won 2–1.                                          Round 2 (conference final) vs New York Liberty won 2–1 WNBA finals lost 3–2

Statistics

Regular season

Awards and honors
Tamika Catchings All star 10th appearance                                               Marissa Coleman All Star 1st appearance

References

External links
The Official Site of the Indiana Fever

Indiana Fever seasons
Indiana Fever
Eastern Conference (WNBA) championship seasons
Indiana Fever